Corancy is a commune in the Nièvre department in central France. On 1 January 2019, the population was 285.

See also
Communes of the Nièvre department
Parc naturel régional du Morvan

References

External links
Official website

Communes of Nièvre